is a railway station in Ōtaki, Chiba, Japan, jointly operated by the Isumi Railway Company and Kominato Railway Company.

Lines
Kazusa-Nakano Station is served by the Isumi Line and Kominato Line. It is located 26.8 km from the eastern terminus of the Izumi Line at Ōhara Station, and 39.1 km from the western terminus of the Kominato Line at Goi Station.

Station layout
Kazusa-Nakano Station has two side platforms, each serving bidirectional traffic, one for the Isumi Line, and the other for the Kominato Line. The station is unstaffed.

Platforms

Adjacent stations

History

Kazusa-Nakano Station was opened on May 16, 1928 as a station on the Kominato Line. On August 26, 1934, the Japanese Government Railway (JGR) Kihara Line, the predecessor of the Isumi Line, began operations from Kazusa-Nakano Station.  The Kihara Line became part of the Japanese National Railways (JNR) after World War II, and freight operations were discontinued from October 1, 1974. With the division and privatization of the Japan National Railways on April 1, 1987, the Kihara Line was acquired by the East Japan Railway Company and was renamed the Isumi Line on March 24, 1988. The station building at Kazusa-Nakano station was rebuilt in 1989.

Surrounding area
 National Route 465

External links

  Isumi Railway Company home page 
 Kominato Railway home page 

Railway stations in Japan opened in 1928
Railway stations in Chiba Prefecture